Tagish is an unincorporated community in Yukon, Canada. The greater Tagish area also includes the Tagish Estates, Tagish Beach and Taku subdivisions, the latter two developed for cottages but now serving for many year-round homes. (California Beach is a part of Tagish Beach subdivision.) Tagish Beach and Taku have their own community hall. The Tagish Road was built in 1942 as part of an oil pipeline project, and the community sprouted around a bridge built over the narrow water between Tagish Lake and Marsh Lake.

The North-West Mounted Police maintained a post in that community during the Klondike Gold Rush.

The area code for Yukon is 867. In it, Tagish is served by prefix 399.

Demographics 

References

External links
Community profile

Settlements in Yukon